is a Japanese manga series written and illustrated by Ryoko Fukuyama. The series is published by Hakusensha in Japan and by Viz Media in the United States. The manga has been adapted into an anime television series that aired from April to June 2017 and a live-action film.

Characters

Main characters
 / 

Played by: Ayami Nakajo
Nino is a first-year high school student who has loved singing since young, being gifted with an extremely resonating voice. She was in love with her singing partner and neighbour Momo until he moved away suddenly, leading to the string of events that let her meet Kanade, whom she called Yuzu. After he leaves her too, she continues to sing for 6 years in hopes that her voice will reach them.

 / 

Played by: Jun Shison
Kanade is a second-year high school student who is known for drinking milk constantly. He nicknames Nino "Alice" from her surname. He initially had writer's block until he met Nino, whose voice reignites his feelings and passion to keep composing, forming a masked band known as "in NO hurry to shout". He has been in love with Nino for a long time now.

  / 

Played by: Yuta Koseki
Momo is Nino's childhood friend who had to move away because of his parents' debt. He is a famous composer by the name of Momo Kiryuu.

 / 

Played by: Yosuke Sugino

 / 

Played by: Erina Mano

 / 

Played by: Hayato Isomura

Entertainment industry
 /

Others

Media

Manga and drama CD
Ryoko Fukuyama launched the series in the 10th issue of Hakusensha's shōjo manga magazine Hana to Yume on 20 April 2013. The manga ended on 5 January 2019. A drama CD was bundled with the 7th issue of Hana to Yume released on 5 March 2014. Fukuyama mentioned that the cast of the drama CD was based on her own recommendation, with most of the cast reprise their roles in the anime adaptation. North American publisher Viz Media announced their license to the series on 2 October 2016. The limited edition of the volume 13 was bundled with drama CD.

Volumes

Anime
An anime television series adaptation was announced via the cover of the 10th issue of Hana to Yume in April 2016 and aired from 11 April 2017 to 27 June 2017, on Tokyo MX, Kansai TV, and BS Fuji The anime is licensed by Sentai Filmworks in North America for streaming and home video release that held a world premiere screening of the first episode at Anime Boston on 1 April 2017 ahead of its release in Japan. Prior to the anime, an internet radio show to promote the series titled  began broadcasting on 8 April 2017. The show is hosted by Saori Hayami and Daiki Yamashita, the voice actors for Nino and Yuzu, respectively.

Music
For the anime television series, six singles were released starting on 19 April 2017. The first single included the anime opening theme  [ANIME SIDE] -Bootleg- by in NO hurry to shout; (vocal: Miou, voiced by Ayahi Takagaki), and insert song  by in NO hurry to shout; (vocal: Nino, voiced by Saori Hayami). The second single included the anime opening theme "High School" with Nino's vocal titled  [ANIME SIDE] -Alternative- by in NO hurry to shout; (vocal: Nino, voiced by Saori Hayami) and was released together with third single on 10 May 2017 that included the anime ending theme  by in NO hurry to shout; (vocal: Nino, voiced by Saori Hayami). The fourth single included insert song  [ANIME SIDE] by in NO hurry to shout; (vocal: Nino, voiced by Saori Hayami) was released on 17 May 2017. The fifth single was released on 14 June 2017 and included insert song "Falling Silent" by Silent Black Kitty (vocal: Miou, voiced by Ayahi Takagaki). The sixth single of the anime  by in NO hurry to shout; (vocal: Nino, voiced by Saori Hayami) was released on 21 June 2017. Anonymous Noise anime original soundtrack was released on 28 June 2017 contains 57 tracks by SADESPER RECORD (NARASAKI / WATCHMAN) and included , a song played by Yuzu on piano and sung by Nino in first episode and its piano score.

Live-action film 
A live-action film adaptation was announced via the 21st issue of Hana to Yume in October 2016. Koichiro Miki directed the film; he and Rie Yokota had written the scripts. Principal photography began in November 2016. The film was released on 25 November 2017 in Japan.

References

External links
  at Hana to Yume 
  
 

2013 manga
2017 anime television series debuts
Anime series based on manga
Anime Strike
Hakusensha manga
Hakusensha franchises
Manga adapted into television series
Sentai Filmworks
Shōjo manga
Romance anime and manga
Viz Media manga
Tokyo MX original programming